The Lycian Peasants, also known as Latona and the Lycian Peasants is a short tale from Greek mythology centered around Leto (known to the Romans as Latona), the mother of the Olympian gods Artemis and Apollo, who was prohibited from drinking from a pond in Lycia by the people there. The myth tackles the ancient Greek concept of xenia, or hospitality, as well as Leto's special connection to the land of Lycia. The impious Lycians refuse to exercise hospitality, the ritualized guest-friendship termed xenia by the ancient Greeks, or else theoxenia, which refers specifically to the instances when a god, such as Leto, is involved. The narrative is most famously known from Ovid's rendition in the poem Metamorphoses.

Mythology 
The story of the Lycian peasants is a short one; legend says that after a very troubling labour on Delos, the goddess Leto took her infants, Artemis and Apollo, and crossed over to Lycia (a region in Asia Minor) where she attempted to bathe her children in and drink from a spring she found there. But the local people tried to stop her, stirring the bottom of the spring so that the mud would come up. Enraged over their lack of hospitality, Leto turned them all into frogs, forever doomed to swim and hop in the murky waters of the spring.

Servius implied that the birth of the twins took place between her two visits to Lycia, the first in which she was rejected, and the second where she returned to enact her punishment. Antoninus Liberalis mentions that the spring Leto tried to drink from on her way to the river Xanthos was called Melite; after being driven away by cattle herders who wished to keep the water for their cattle, some wolves befriended her and led her to the Xanthos, where she bathed her children. She then returned to the spring to transform the Lycians into frogs.

One of the Vatican Mythographers records the story and supplants Leto with Ceres/Demeter, who tried to drink from the spring, thirsty as she was after days of looking for her abducted daughter Persephone, who had been snatched by Hades, the king of the Underworld. The anonymous author is the only one to record the variation with Demeter.

Symbolism

Lycian Leto 

Leto was particularly worshipped in Lycia, and was seen as the 'national deity' of the Lycians, and similarly Lycia was an important cult center for her two children as well. Leto had an important sanctuary, the Letoon, in Lycia, just west of the city of Xanthos, along the Xanthos river. Traditionally, the etymology offered for Leto's name has even been the Lycian word lada, meaning 'wife', although other scholars like Paul Kretschmer and Robert S. P. Beekes have suggested a pre-Greek origin instead. Although not explicitly stated, it is implied, and apparently understood in antiquity, that the site where the confrontation between Leto and the Lycians took place was the same where the Letoon was erected, as the description matches geography.

The region's name Lycia had been (erroneously) connected by the ancient Greeks to their word for wolf, lykos, and held that the land had taken its name after the friendly wolves who, unlike the rejecting humans, showed hospitality to Leto. Similarly, Leto's son Apollo bore the epithet Lyceus, an epithet which, although usually indicating his youth and connection to light (lyke), had been interpreted occasionally to denote Apollo's connection to wolves and Lycia.

Thanks to Antoninus Liberalis citing the earlier writers Menecrates of Ephesus and Nicander as the sources for his tale, Leto's arrival in Lycia can be dated to around the early fourth century BC, a period during which the city of Xanthos would have been a mixed settlement of Greeks and local Lycians.

Stephanos of Byzantium recounts a story of how an elderly Lycian woman named Syessa received and entertained Leto in her cottage, a sharp contrast to the unhospitable peasants, like the wolves; Polycharmos held that Apollo and Leto had been both born in Araxa, up in the Xanthos valley, which seems to be a Hellenistic innovation. Stitching those fragments together, a story can be assembled, in which the twins are born in Araxa, Leto comes to Xanthos, the wolves lead her to the water, while Syessa offers her food, and Leto finally establishes her shrine.

Hospitality 
Xenia, in an ancient Greek concept, is understood to mean 'guest-friendship' or 'ritualized friendship', and was an institutionalized relationship rooted in generosity, gift exchange, and reciprocity. Offering hospitality to strangers, whether ethnic Greeks or foreigners, was seen as a moral obligation, and was based on two basic rules; the respect of the hosts towards the guests, who must provide a meal, bath and gifts, and the respect of the guests towards the hosts, who have to be courteous and not overstay their welcome.

The Lycian peasants, who callously attempted to stop a fatigued mother and her young children from using the water of the pond thus broke a very sacred rule and concept of ancient Greek culture, and thus paid by being transformed into hideous, disgusting creatures.

Art 

In post-antiquity art, the myth of Leto's transformation of the peasants into frogs of the pond became very popular, the most popular depiction of Leto. This scene, dubbed called Latona and the Lycian Peasants or Latona and the Frogs, became very popular in Northern Mannerist art, as it allowed a combination of mythology with landscape painting and scenes of peasantry, combining history painting and genre painting. In later art, the Lycian peasants became the scene in which Leto exclusively appeared in. In paintings, Leto is usually portrayed with the two little children by the lake, while the peasants, about to be changed into frogs, are in a short distance away from her.

In the Gardens of Versailles, France, lies the Latona Fountain, built in 1670, which depicts the myth; on the top tier stands a statue of Leto with her children Artemis and Apollo surrounded by six lead half-human, half-frog sculptures placed around the perimeter of the basin. The four tiers are covered in 230 pieces of marble, composed of the white and grey-veined Cararra, greenish marble from Campan, and red marble from Languedoc. A copy of the Latona fountain was built in the gardens of Herrenchiemsee, a palace complex in Bavaria, Germany.

The tale has also inspired music, like the Verwandlung der lycischen Bauern in Frösche ("Transformation of the Lycian Peasants into Frogs") by Austrian composer Carl Ditters von Dittersdorf, one among the several symphonies composed based on tales from Ovid's Metamorphoses.

Gallery

See also 

 Baucis and Philemon
 Lycaon
 Milk of Hera
 Polyphemus

References

Bibliography 

 Antoninus Liberalis, The Metamorphoses of Antoninus Liberalis translated by Francis Celoria (Routledge 1992). Online version at the Topos Text Project.
 
 
 
 
 
 
 
 
 
 
 
 
 
  Online version at Perseus.tufts Library.

External links 
 

Leto
Lycia
Anatolian characters in Greek mythology
Metamorphoses characters
Metamorphoses into animals in Greek mythology
Deeds of Demeter
Artemis in art
Apollo in art
Ancient Greek culture